The Mine Train Through Nature's Wonderland was a  narrow gauge railroad attraction in Frontierland in Disneyland, that featured Audio-Animatronic animals in natural desert- and woods-themed  environments. It opened on June 12, 1960, as an extension of Rainbow Caverns Mine Train, which opened on July 2, 1956. It closed on January 2, 1977, to make room for Big Thunder Mountain Railroad.

History
In 1956, the Rainbow Caverns Mine Train was opened in Frontierland, as part of the Living Desert. Guests boarded a miniature train and were transported through the various scenery of the desert environment, which featured anthropomorphic cacti, the Balancing Rocks which precariously rolled back and forth above the guests, and the beautiful Rainbow Caverns. The Living Desert was also host to other attractions like the Conestoga Wagons, Stagecoaches, and Pack Mules, though the former two disappeared when Nature's Wonderland was introduced.

Mine Train Through Nature's Wonderland was redesigned by Marc Davis when Walt Disney requested him to insert more humor into Disneyland's attractions. Rainbow Caverns Mine Train was closed and redesigned into Nature's Wonderland, taking inspiration from True-Life Adventures. The scenes of the Living Desert and Rainbow Caverns were incorporated into the redesign, which had guests boarding a train at the fictional Western town Rainbow Ridge before heading off into the attraction. The train traveled through Cascade Peak, Bear Country, Beaver Valley, the Living Desert, Devil's Paint Pots (multicolored geysers), and Rainbow Caverns before returning to the station. The attraction featured over two-hundred replicas of North American animals, and the narrative was provided by Dallas McKennon (who also did voices for some of Walt Disney's feature films and is the voice of Gumby).

Due to the rise in popularity for thrill rides, Nature's Wonderland was closed to build a new attraction, Big Thunder Mountain Railroad, which opened in 1979. However, Big Thunder Mountain is similar to Nature's Wonderland, featuring a runaway train as the ride vehicle, the set of Rainbow Ridge is used as the loading area, and a tribute to Rainbow Caverns exists within the attraction.

A surviving locomotive from the ride was part of the scenery on Rivers of America for years, near the former location of Cascade Peak. It was removed in 2010 and sat abandoned in a lot for years until it was moved to the Los Angeles Live Steamers Railroad Museum in 2014, pending final contracts for donation to the Carolwood Society, but was then returned to Disney when negotiations dragged. The deal was finally signed in 2016, and the group began raising funds to restore the engine. It will be placed on display in a new building next door to the Carolwood barn.

An episode of Mickey Mouse titled "Nature's Wonderland" was released in October 2017, with its story made in homage of the defunct attraction.

See also

List of former Disneyland attractions
Rail transport in Walt Disney Parks and Resorts

References

Bibliography

External links

1956 establishments in California
1977 disestablishments in California
Amusement rides introduced in 1960
Disneyland
Former Walt Disney Parks and Resorts attractions
Frontierland
Heritage railroads in California
Rail transport in Walt Disney Parks and Resorts
Railroads of amusement parks in the United States
Western (genre) amusement rides